West Lockinge is a village in Lockinge civil parish, about  east of Wantage. It was part of Berkshire until the 1974 local authority boundary changes transferred the Vale of White Horse to Oxfordshire. The village is included within the North Wessex Downs Area of Outstanding Natural Beauty (AONB).

Geography
A chalk stream Goddard's Brook emerges in the village, feeding into Ginge Brook, which eventually joins the River Ock near Abingdon. In 1993 a mixed conifer and deciduous woodland was planted behind the village, the area is named Christopher's Wood after Christopher Loyd, previous manager of the Lockinge Estate.  National Cycle Route 544 passes through the village.

History
The route of the ancient Icknield Way passes through the village.  Arnhill and the nearby vicinity behind the village was an Iron Age fortification and Anglo-Saxon burial ground. Although a barrow was destroyed by ploughing, in approximately 1863 remains and artefacts were recovered from the summit of the hill.  West Lockinge had a tithe barn for several centuries but no trace of it now survives. An open field system of farming also prevailed in West Lockinge parish until it was enclosed in 1808.  One cottage in the village is half-timbered and bears the date 1666.  

West Lockinge Farm has a Georgian farmhouse of five bays. It is built of blue and red brick and has a hipped roof. A record from 1770 of a "new erected messuage" at West Lockinge may refer to this house, which has been enlarged by later alterations. The farm is now run by Henrietta Knight and formerly Terry Biddlecombe, trainers of the racing horse Best Mate. Since 1958 there has been a Lockinge Stakes horse race at Newbury Racecourse.

References

Sources

External links

Villages in Oxfordshire
Vale of White Horse